"Cristal d'Acier" is the debut song recorded by French singer-songwriter DyE for his debut studio album, Taki 183 (2011). It was released as the record's first and lead single on 11 January 2010.

Track listing 
12" Vinyl single
 A1. "Cristal d'Acier" – 5:01
 A2. "Cristal d'Acier (Logo Remix)" – 4:56
 B1. "Neige 606 (DJ Mehdi Remix)" – 4:41
 B2. "Neige 606 (Society of Silence Remix)" – 6:06

Release history

References 

2010 singles
2010 songs